The Knoxville Police Department is the law enforcement agency of the City of Knoxville, Tennessee, United States.

History
Knoxville was settled in the late 18th century, but law enforcement and criminal justice were handled by Knox County in its earliest years. By the early 1800s, Knoxville began to establish its own municipal government services, and Joseph R. Reed was named Town Sergeant in 1802. He was paid $80 per year, and his responsibilities included patrolling the town two nights per week and enforcing the observance of the Sabbath. For the next half a century, policing in Knoxville was informal and often the responsibility of one paid employee and some unpaid night watchmen.

In 1857, M. V. Bridwell was named the first chief of police, and paid watchmen (discreetly appointed men referred to as "secret police") were first utilized in 1867. In 1885, a three-man board of public works was created in Knoxville to give more structured oversight to police officers and other city employees.

In 1901, Knoxville officers accosted Harvey Logan (also known as Kid Curry), an outlaw and a member of Butch Cassidy's Wild Bunch who had been suspected in the deaths of several other law enforcement officials. Officers William Dinwiddie and Robert Saylor were wounded in the ensuing shootout. Logan was arrested for the shootings, but he escaped from jail; he fatally shot himself in 1904 while being pursued by a posse. Dinwiddie and Saylor both died in 1914, and both of their deaths were attributed to complications of the 1901 shooting.

Organization
As of 2023, the Chief of Police is Paul Noel. The department has three bureaus, the Field Operations Bureau contains the majority of the uniformed members, the Investigation Bureau Division is responsible for all criminal and felony investigations within the department and the Management Services Division oversees human resources, financial, and legal aspects of the department. The Support Services Division oversees all programs and educational and training aspects of the department, as well as volunteer programs.

Controversies
The Knoxville Police Department has been accused of using excessive force on multiple occasions.

Culpable in the wrongful death of Lisa Edwards on Feb. 5, 2023. A Wheelchair bound, 60 year old prior stroke patient is first mocked for being unable to lift herself into a police van and then left to slip into unconsciousness, and later death, from lack of care in police custody.
Body cam footage from Sgt. Brandon Wardlaw shows Lisa begging to be helped up during the initial 'arrest' of an old woman seeking medical care. Sgt. Wardlaw then interrupts the woman's pleas saying "it is the 'Lords Day' and that all I want is some oatmeal and coffee." Sgt. Wardlaw then informs the then wheelchair needing, currently stroking out, Lisa that the KPD have wasted too much time on her and to "cut out the dead weight crap." (It was perhaps at this point that cognitive reasoning in properly trained law officers would suggest a medical professional may need to be consulted? Be alas, no cognitive reasoning was to be found in KPD this day.)
Lisa was then shoved into a police cruiser as it was lower to the ground (and the police have no lifting capability or measures in place for disabled citizens), placed Lisa Edward in sideways and then waited for her to lose consciousness before getting her a medical professional. 
Officers involved (Sergeant Brandon Wardlaw, Officer Adam Barnett, Officer Timothy Distasio and Transportation Officer Danny Dugan) received PTO while Edwards' family has buried her. In this instance, no KPD officer chose to uphold their duty to Protect and Serve Lisa Edwards of Knoxville. They had better things to do. 
 

On November 26, 2018, Sierra McCauley, 23 years old, was killed by KPD Officer James Gadd on November 26. McCauley was naked and holding a knife when Officer Gadd arrived on scene. He gave 10 verbal commands in 22 seconds before fatally shooting her. The shooting was ruled justified. Officer Gadd is a 23-year KPD veteran. McCauley's death was cited by Knox County Democratic Party Progressive Action Committee as evidence of "racial bias, excessive use of force, and/or
insufficient mental health crisis intervention training of the officers involved."
 
On August 26, 2019, "Philly" Pheap was suspected of a hit and run. According to eyewitnesses, he was shot twice in the back by KPD Officer Dylan M. Williams. There is no camera footage of the shooting, though dash camera footage of some of the lead up is available. Pheap's death was also cited in the Knox County Democratic Party Progressive Action Committee report. A Federal wrongful death lawsuit has been filed by Pheap's family seeking $5M in damages.

In July 2014 Ron Carden was shot in the back by Knoxville Police Department Officer David Gerlach. The shooting happened just off to the side of the view of the cruiser mounted camera. According to local Knoxville USA Today affiliate KnoxNews "Chief U.S. District Judge Tom Varlan ruled Tuesday attorney Richard M. Brooks failed – after nearly three years of litigation and a day’s worth of trial testimony in U.S. District Court – to present enough evidence to allow the jury to even consider whether Knoxville Police Department Officer David Gerlach had the legal right to use deadly force against parolee Ronald E. Carden."

See also

 List of law enforcement agencies in Tennessee

References

External links
Knoxville Police Dept

Government of Knoxville, Tennessee
Municipal police departments of Tennessee